Bietnitz is a river of Mecklenburg-Vorpommern, Germany. It flows into the Binnensee in Pinnow. The Binnensee is drained via the Mühlensee and the Mühlenfließ to the Warnow.

See also
List of rivers of Mecklenburg-Vorpommern

Rivers of Mecklenburg-Western Pomerania
Rivers of Germany

References